Hydrogen embrittlement (HE), also known as hydrogen-assisted cracking or hydrogen-induced cracking (HIC), is a reduction in the ductility of a metal due to absorbed hydrogen. Hydrogen atoms are small and can permeate solid metals. Once absorbed, hydrogen lowers the stress required for cracks in the metal to initiate and propagate, resulting in embrittlement. Hydrogen embrittlement occurs most notably in steels, as well as in iron, nickel, titanium, cobalt, and their alloys. Copper, aluminium, and stainless steels are less susceptible to hydrogen embrittlement.

The essential facts about the nature of hydrogen embrittlement have been known since the 19th century.
Hydrogen embrittlement is maximised at around room temperature in steels, and most metals are relatively immune to hydrogen embrittlement at temperatures above 150 °C. Hydrogen embrittlement requires the presence of both atomic ("diffusible") hydrogen and a mechanical stress to induce crack growth, although that stress may be applied or residual. Hydrogen embrittlement increases at lower strain rates. In general, higher-strength materials are more susceptible to hydrogen embrittlement.

Metals can be exposed to hydrogen from two types of sources: gaseous hydrogen and hydrogen chemically generated at the metal surface. Gaseous hydrogen is molecular hydrogen and does not cause embrittlement though it can cause hot hydrogen attack (see below). It is the atomic hydrogen from chemical attack which causes embrittlement because the atomic hydrogen dissolves quickly into the metal at room temperature. Gaseous hydrogen is found in pressure vessels and pipelines. Electrochemical sources of hydrogen include acids (as may be encountered during pickling, etching, or cleaning), corrosion (typically due to aqueous corrosion or cathodic protection), and electroplating. Hydrogen can be introduced into the metal during manufacturing by the presence of moisture during welding or while the metal is molten. The most common causes of failure in practice are poorly-controlled electroplating or damp welding rods.

Hydrogen embrittlement as a term can be used to refer specifically to the embrittlement that occurs in steels and similar metals at relatively low hydrogen concentrations, or it can be used to encompass all embrittling effects that hydrogen has on metals. These broader embrittling effects include hydride formation, which occurs in titanium and vanadium but not in steels, and hydrogen-induced blistering, which only occurs at high hydrogen concentrations and does not require the presence of stress. However, hydrogen embrittlement is almost always distinguished from high temperature hydrogen attack (HTHA), which occurs in steels at temperatures above 400 °C and involves the formation of methane pockets. The mechanisms (there are many) by which hydrogen causes embrittlement in steels are not comprehensively understood and continue to be explored and studied.

Mechanisms 
 
Hydrogen embrittlement is a complex process involving a number of distinct contributing micro-mechanisms, not all of which need to be present. The mechanisms include the formation of brittle hydrides, the creation of voids that can lead to high-pressure bubbles, enhanced decohesion at internal surfaces and localised plasticity at crack tips that assist in the propagation of cracks. There is a great variety of mechanisms that have been proposed and investigated as to the cause of brittleness once diffusible hydrogen has been dissolved into the metal. In recent years, it has become widely accepted that HE is a complex, material and environmental dependent process, so that no single mechanism applies exclusively.

 Internal pressure: At high hydrogen concentrations, absorbed hydrogen species recombine in voids to form hydrogen molecules (H2), creating pressure from within the metal. This pressure can increase to levels where cracks form, commonly designated hydrogen-induced cracking (HIC), as well as blisters forming on the specimen surface, designated hydrogen-induced blistering. These effects can reduce ductility and tensile strength.
 Hydrogen enhanced localised plasticity (HELP): Hydrogen increases the nucleation and movement of dislocations at a crack tip. HELP results in crack propagation by localised ductile failure at the crack tip with less deformation occurring in the surrounding material, which gives a brittle appearance to the fracture.
 Hydrogen decreased dislocation emission: Molecular dynamics simulations reveal a ductile-to-brittle transition caused by the suppression of dislocation emission at the crack tip by dissolved hydrogen. This prevents the crack tip rounding-off, so the sharp crack then leads to brittle-cleavage failure.
 Hydrogen enhanced decohesion (HEDE): Interstitial hydrogen lowers the stress required for metal atoms to fracture apart. HEDE can only occur when the local concentration of hydrogen is high, such as due to the increased hydrogen solubility in the tensile stress field at a crack tip, at stress concentrators, or in the tension field of edge dislocations.
 Metal hydride formation: The formation of brittle hydrides with the parent material allows cracks to propagate in a brittle fashion. This is particularly a problem with vanadium alloys, but most structural alloys do not easily form hydrides.
 Phase transformations: Hydrogen can induce phase transformations in some materials, and the new phase may be less ductile.

Material susceptibility
Hydrogen embrittles a variety of metals including steel, aluminium (at high temperatures only), and titanium. Austempered iron is also susceptible, though austempered steel (and possibly other austempered metals) displays increased resistance to hydrogen embrittlement. NASA has reviewed which metals are susceptible to embrittlement and which only prone to hot hydrogen attack: nickel alloys, austenitic stainless steels, aluminium and alloys, copper (including alloys, e.g. beryllium copper). Sandia has also produced a comprehensive guide.

Steels 

Steel with an ultimate tensile strength of less than 1000 MPa (~145,000 psi) or hardness of less than HRC 32 on the Hardness Rockwell Scale is not generally considered susceptible to hydrogen embrittlement. As an example of severe hydrogen embrittlement, the elongation at failure of 17-4PH precipitation hardened stainless steel was measured to drop from 17% to only 1.7% when smooth specimens were exposed to high-pressure hydrogen

As the strength of steels increases, the fracture toughness decreases, so the likelihood that hydrogen embrittlement will lead to fracture increases. In high-strength steels, anything above a hardness of HRC 32 may be susceptible to early hydrogen cracking after plating processes that introduce hydrogen. They may also experience long-term failures anytime from weeks to decades after being placed in service due to accumulation of hydrogen over time from cathodic protection and other sources. Numerous failures have been reported in the hardness range from HRC 32-36 and more above; therefore, parts in this range should be checked during quality control to ensure they are not susceptible.

Testing the fracture toughness of hydrogen-charged, embrittled specimens is complicated by the need to keep charged specimens very cold, in liquid nitrogen, to prevent the hydrogen diffusing away.

Copper 
Copper alloys which contain oxygen can be embrittled if exposed to hot hydrogen. This process can cause the grains to literally be forced away from each other, and is known as steam embrittlement (because steam is directly produced inside the copper crystal lattice, not because exposure of copper to external steam causes the problem).

Vanadium, nickel, and titanium 
Alloys of vanadium, nickel, and titanium have a high hydrogen solubility, and can therefore absorb significant amounts of hydrogen. This can lead to hydride formation, resulting in irregular volume expansion and reduced ductility (because metallic hydrides are fragile ceramic materials). This is a particular issue when looking for non-palladium-based alloys for use in hydrogen separation membranes.

Fatigue 
While most failures in practice have been through fast failure, there is experimental evidence that hydrogen also affects the fatigue properties of steels. This is entirely expected given the nature of the embrittlement mechanisms proposed for fast fracture. In general hydrogen embrittlement has a strong effect on high-stress, low-cycle fatigue and very little effect on high-cycle fatigue.

Environmental Embrittlement 
Hydrogen embrittlement is a volume effect: it affects the volume of the material. Environmental embrittlement is a surface effect where molecules from the atmosphere surrounding the material under test are adsorbed onto the fresh crack surface. This is most clearly seen from fatigue measurements where the measured crack growth rates can be an order of magnitude higher in hydrogen than in air. That this effect is due to adsorption, which saturates when the crack surface is completely covered,  is understood from the weak dependence of the effect on the pressure of hydrogen.

Environmental embrittlement is also observed to reduce fracture toughness in fast fracture tests, but the severity is much reduced compared with the same effect in fatigue

Hydrogen embrittlement is the effect where a previously embrittled material has low fracture toughness whatever atmosphere it is tested in. Environmental embrittlement is the effect when the low fracture toughness is only observed when the testing happens in that atmosphere.

Sources of hydrogen 
During manufacture, hydrogen can be dissolved into the component by processes such as phosphating, pickling, electroplating, casting, carbonizing, surface cleaning, electrochemical machining, welding, hot roll forming, and heat treatments.

During service use, hydrogen can be dissolved into the metal from wet corrosion or through misapplication of protection measures such as cathodic protection. In one case of failure during construction of the San Francisco–Oakland Bay Bridge galvanized (i.e. zinc-plated) rods were left wet for 5 years before being tensioned. The reaction of the zinc with water introduced hydrogen into the steel.

A common case of embrittlement during manufacture is poor arc welding practice, in which hydrogen is released from moisture, such as in the coating of welding electrodes or from damp welding rods. To avoid atomic hydrogen formation in the high temperature plasma of the arc, welding rods have to be perfectly dried in an oven at the appropriate temperature and duration before use. Another way to minimize the formation of hydrogen is to use special low-hydrogen electrodes for welding high-strength steels.

Apart from arc welding, the most common problems are from chemical or electrochemical processes which, by reduction of hydrogen ions or water, generate hydrogen atoms at the surface, which rapidly dissolve in the metal.  One of these chemical reactions involves hydrogen sulfide in sulfide stress cracking (SSC), a significant problem for the oil and gas industries.

After a manufacturing process or treatment which may cause hydrogen ingress, the component should be baked to remove or immobilize the hydrogen.

Prevention 
Hydrogen embrittlement can be prevented through several methods, all of which are centered on minimizing contact between the metal and hydrogen, particularly during fabrication and the electrolysis of water. Embrittling procedures such as acid pickling should be avoided, as should increased contact with elements such as sulfur and phosphate. The use of proper electroplating solution and procedures can also help to prevent hydrogen embrittlement.

If the metal has not yet started to crack, hydrogen embrittlement can be reversed by removing the hydrogen source and causing the hydrogen within the metal to diffuse out through heat treatment. This de-embrittlement process, known as low hydrogen annealing or "baking", is used to overcome the weaknesses of methods such as electroplating which introduce hydrogen to the metal, but is not always entirely effective because a sufficient time and temperature must be reached. Tests such as ASTM F1624 can be used to rapidly identify the minimum baking time (by testing using design of experiments, a relatively low number of samples can be used to pinpoint this value). Then the same test can be used as a quality control check to evaluate if baking was sufficient on a per-batch basis. 
 
In the case of welding, often pre-heating and post-heating the metal is applied to allow the hydrogen to diffuse out before it can cause any damage. This is specifically done with high-strength steels and low alloy steels such as the chromium/molybdenum/vanadium alloys. Due to the time needed to re-combine hydrogen atoms into the hydrogen molecules, hydrogen cracking due to welding can occur over 24 hours after the welding operation is completed.

Another way of preventing this problem is through materials selection. This will build an inherent resistance to this process and reduce the need of post processing or constant monitoring for failure. Certain metals or alloys are highly susceptible to this issue, so choosing a material that is minimally affected while retaining the desired properties would also provide an optimal solution. Much research has been done to catalog the compatibility of  certain metals with hydrogen.
 
Tests such as ASTM F1624 can also be used to rank alloys and coatings during materials selection to ensure (for instance) that the threshold of cracking is below the threshold for hydrogen-assisted stress corrosion cracking. Similar tests can also be used during quality control to more effectively qualify materials being produced in a rapid and comparable manner.

Testing

Most analytical methods for hydrogen embrittlement involve evaluating the effects of (1) internal hydrogen from production and/or (2) external sources of hydrogen such as cathodic protection. For steels, it is important to test specimens in the lab that are at least as hard (or harder) than the final parts will be. Ideally, specimens should be made of the final material or the nearest possible representative, as fabrication can have a profound impact on resistance to hydrogen-assisted cracking.

There are numerous ASTM standards for testing for hydrogen embrittlement:

 ASTM B577 is the Standard Test Methods for Detection of Cuprous Oxide (Hydrogen Embrittlement Susceptibility) in Copper. The test focuses on hydrogen embrittlement of copper alloys, including a metallographic evaluation (method A), testing in a hydrogen charged chamber followed by metallography (method B), and method C is the same as B but includes a bend test.  
 ASTM B839 is the Standard Test Method for Residual Embrittlement in Metallic Coated, Externally Threaded Articles, Fasteners, and Rod-Inclined Wedge Method. 
 ASTM F519 is the Standard Test Method for Mechanical Hydrogen Embrittlement Evaluation of Plating/Coating Processes and Service Environments. There are 7 different samples designs and the two most commons tests are (1) the rapid test, the Rising step load testing (RSL) method per ASTM F1624 and (2) the sustained load test, which takes 200 hours. The sustained load test is still included in many legacy standards, but the RSL method is increasingly being adopted due to speed, repeatability, and the quantitative nature of the test. The RSL method provides an accurate ranking of the effect of hydrogen from both internal and external sources. 
 ASTM F1459 is the Standard Test Method for Determination of the Susceptibility of Metallic Materials to Hydrogen Gas Embrittlement (HGE) Test.  The test uses a diaphragm loaded with a differential pressure. 
 ASTM G142 is the Standard Test Method for Determination of Susceptibility of Metals to Embrittlement in Hydrogen Containing Environments at High Pressure, High Temperature, or Both. The test uses a cylindrical tensile specimen tested into an enclosure pressurized with hydrogen or helium.
 ASTM F1624 is the Standard Test Method for Measurement of Hydrogen Embrittlement Threshold in Steel by the Incremental Step Loading Technique. The test uses the incremental step loading (ISL) or Rising step load testing (RSL) method for quantitatively testing for the Hydrogen Embrittlement threshold stress for the onset of Hydrogen-Induced Cracking due to platings and coatings from Internal Hydrogen Embrittlement (IHE) and Environmental Hydrogen Embrittlement (EHE). F1624 provides a rapid, quantitative measure of the effects of hydrogen both from internal sources and external sources (which is accomplished by applying a selected voltage in an electrochemical cell). The F1624 test is performed by comparing a standard fast-fracture tensile strength to the fracture strength from a Rising step load testing practice where the load is held for hour(s) at each step. In many cases it can be performed in 30 hours or less.  
 ASTM F1940 is the Standard Test Method for Process Control Verification to Prevent Hydrogen Embrittlement in Plated or Coated Fasteners. While the title now explicitly includes the word fasteners, F1940 was not originally intended for these purposes. F1940 is based on the F1624 method and is similar to F519 but with different root radius and stress concentration factors. When specimens exhibit a threshold cracking of 75% of the net fracture strength, the plating bath is considered to be 'non-embrittling'.

There are many other related standards for hydrogen embrittlement: 
 NACE TM0284-2003 (NACE International) Resistance to Hydrogen-Induced Cracking
 ISO 11114-4:2005 (ISO)Test methods for selecting metallic materials resistant to hydrogen embrittlement. 
 Standard Test Method for Mechanical Hydrogen Embrittlement Evaluation of Plating/Coating Processes and Service Environments

Notable failures from hydrogen embrittlement 
 In 2013, six months prior to opening, the East Span of the Oakland Bay Bridge failed during testing. Catastrophic failures occurred in shear bolts in the span, after only two weeks of service, with the failure attributed to embrittlement (see details above).
 In the City of London, 122 Leadenhall Street, generally known as 'the Cheesegrater', suffered from hydrogen embrittlement in steel bolts, with three bolts failing in 2014 and 2015.  Most of the 3,000 bolts were replaced at a cost of £6m.

See also

 Hydrogen analyzer
 Hydrogen damage
 Hydrogen piping
 Hydrogen safety
 Low hydrogen annealing
 Nascent hydrogen
 Oxygen-free copper
 Stress corrosion cracking

References

External links
  Resources on hydrogen embrittlement, Cambridge University
 Hydrogen embrittlement
 Hydrogen purity plays a critical role
 A Sandia National Lab technical reference manual.
  Hydrogen embrittlement, NASA

Corrosion
Electrochemistry
Hydrogen
Materials degradation
Metalworking